Andrés Molteni and Horacio Zeballos were the defending champions, but Zeballos chose to compete in Hamburg instead. Molteni played alongside Adil Shamasdin, but lost in the quarterfinals to Wesley Koolhof and Artem Sitak.

Bob Bryan and Mike Bryan won the title, defeating Koolhof and Sitak in the final, 6–3, 6–4.

Seeds

Draw

Draw

References 
 Main Draw

BBundT Atlanta Open - Doubles
BBundT Atlanta Open - Doubles
2017 Doubles